Runcorn was a rural district in Cheshire, England from 1894 until 1974. It was named after but did not include Runcorn, a town on the River Mersey to the north-west of the district, which formed its own urban district.

The district was abolished in 1974 under the Local Government Act 1972. It was split between the new districts of Vale Royal, Warrington and Halton, with the parishes of Appleton, Grappenhall, Hatton, Stockton Heath, Stretton, and Walton going to Warrington; the parishes of Daresbury, Moore and Preston Brook going to Halton (with Runcorn town), and the rest going to Vale Royal (now Cheshire West and Chester). The council had its offices at Castle Park in Frodsham.

Parishes 

 Acton Grange (abolished in 1936 to form part of Walton)
 Alvanley
 Antrobus
 Appleton
 Aston-by-Sutton
 Aston Grange (abolished in 1936 to form part of Aston)
 Bartington (abolished in 1936 to enlarge Dutton)
 Clifton (abolished in 1936 to enlarge Runcorn and Sutton)
 Crowley (abolished in 1936 to enlarge Antrobus)
 Daresbury
 Dutton
 Frodsham
 Frodsham Lordship (abolished in 1936 to enlarge Frodsham)
 Grappenhall
 Great Budworth
 Halton (unclear if abolished in 1936 to enlarge Runcorn)
 Hatton
 Helsby
 Higher Whitley (abolished in 1936 to form part of Whitley)
 Keckwick (abolished in 1936 to enlarge Daresbury)
 Kingsley
 Kingswood (abolished in 1936 to enlarge Kingsley, Manley and Norley)
 Lands common to Frodsham and Frodsham Lordship (Frodsham Lordship was abolished in 1936 to enlarge Frodsham)
 Latchford Without (abolished in 1936 to enlarge Stockton Heath)
 Lower Whitley (abolished in 1936 to form part of Whitley)
 Manley
 Moore
 Newton by Daresbury (abolished in 1936 to enlarge Daresbury)
 Newton by Frodsham (abolished in 1967 - unclear which parish it enlarged)
 Norley
 Preston Brook
 Preston on the Hill (abolished in 1935 to enlarge Preston Brook)
 Seven Oaks (abolished in 1936 to enlarge Antrobus)
 Stockham (abolished in 1936 to enlarge Norton)
 Stockton Heath
 Stretton
 Thelwall
 Walton
 Walton Inferior (abolished in 1936 to form part of Walton)
 Walton Superior (abolished in 1936 to form part of Walton)
 Weston (abolished in 1936 to enlarge Runcorn)
 Whitley

References

Runcorn
History of Cheshire
Former districts of Cheshire
Districts of England created by the Local Government Act 1894
Districts of England abolished by the Local Government Act 1972
Rural districts of England